Fulton Hill is the fifth studio album by American metal band Alabama Thunderpussy, released in 2004.

Release history
Relapse Records released it on vinyl on June 8, in a pressing of 1,000 (500 on blue vinyl, 500 on black). An additional 100 copies were pressed onto clear vinyl, but these were not available to the public.

Track listing
"Such Is Life" - 4:24	
"R.R.C.C." - 3:57	
"Wage Slave" - 3:35	
"Three Stars" - 5:25	
"Bear Bating" - 7:23	
"Infested" - 4:17	
"Alone Again" - 6:57
"Lunar Eclipse" - 3:22	
"Blasphemy" - 3:53	
"Do Not" - 6:22	
"Sociopath Shitlist" - 4:24	
"Struggling For Balance" - 13:34	
"Seekers" - 10:09 (bonus track on Japanese release)

Personnel
 Johnny Weills - vocals
 Erik Larson - guitars, backing vocals
 Ryan Lake - guitars
 Bryan Cox - drums
 John Peters - bass
 Nathan Brown - piano, organ
 Alan Douches - mastering
 Scott C. Kinkade - photography
 Mark Miley - producer

2004 albums
Alabama Thunderpussy albums
Relapse Records albums